Events from the year 1889 in Scotland.

Incumbents 

 Secretary for Scotland and Keeper of the Great Seal – The Marquess of Lothian

Law officers 
 Lord Advocate – James Robertson
 Solicitor General for Scotland – Moir Tod Stormonth Darling

Judiciary 
 Lord President of the Court of Session and Lord Justice General – Lord Glencorse
 Lord Justice Clerk – Lord Kingsburgh

Events 
 26 January – Dundee is granted city status in the United Kingdom by letters patent.
 5 February – the first issue of Glasgow University Magazine is published.
 11 March – baby farmer Jessie King is the last woman to be hanged in Edinburgh, for infanticide.
 24 April – William Henry Bury is hanged in Dundee for uxoricide.
 15 July – the Scottish National Portrait Gallery opens in Edinburgh in premises designed by Rowand Anderson, the first in the world to be purpose-built as a portrait gallery.
 26 August – the Local Government (Scotland) Act 1889, receives royal assent. School fees abolished for compulsory education.
 5 September – Mauricewood Colliery disaster: a fire at the pit near Penicuik kills 63 of the 70 men and boys working underground.
 1 November – new building under construction at Templeton's Carpet Factory on Glasgow Green collapses killing 29 women in adjacent weaving sheds.

Births 
 7 January – George Samson, sailor, recipient of the Victoria Cross (died at sea 1923)
 30 May – Isobel Wylie Hutchison, explorer (died 1982)
 20 July – John Reith, broadcasting executive (died 1971)
 11 August – Ronald Fairbairn, psychoanalyst (died 1964)
 25 September – Charles Kenneth Scott Moncrieff, writer (died 1930)
 1 December – Alexander Keiller, marmalade manufacturer and archaeologist (died 1955)
 John Munro (Iain Rothach), Gaelic poet (killed in action 1918)

Deaths 
 31 May – Horatius Bonar, churchman, writer and hymnodist (born 1808)
 24 December – Charles Mackay, poet, journalist, author, anthologist, novelist and songwriter (born 1812)

The arts
 Arthur Conan Doyle's novel The Mystery of Cloomber is published.
 Robert Louis Stevenson's novel The Master of Ballantrae is published.
 The Great Scottish National Panorama (Battle of Bannockburn) is opened in Sauchiehall Street, Glasgow.

See also 
 Timeline of Scottish history
 1889 in the United Kingdom

References 

 
Years of the 19th century in Scotland
Scotland
1880s in Scotland